RYK or  Ryk may refer to:

 Related to receptor tyrosine kinase, a mammalian gene, and Ryk, the protein it encodes
 Rahim Yar Khan, a city in Punjab, Pakistan
 Rajiv Yuva Kiranalu, an employment programme in Andhra Pradesh, India
 Shaikh Zayed International Airport (IATA: RYK), in Rahim Yar Khan, Pakistan
 The Afrikaans and Frisian equivalent of the German word reich

People with the given name
 Ryk Neethling (born 1977), a South African swimmer
 Ryk van Schoor (1921–2009), a South African rugby player
 Ryk Tulbagh (1699–1771), governor of the Dutch Cape Colony

See also